Bjarnarey is an uninhabited island in the Vestmann Islands, south of Iceland. It is one of the 18 islands that make up the Vestmannaeyjar archipelago.

External links 
 All you need to know about Westman Islands

Islands of Iceland
Vestmannaeyjar